Benjamin Fischer (born 19 October 1980) is a retired football striker from Liechtenstein.
He began his career with the Swiss club Grasshopper Club Zürich in the youth team and holds a Swiss passport.

In February 2011, he retired from professional football following a recurrence of back and thigh injuries.

International career
Fischer nearly made history when, in the final qualifier for World Cup 2006 in Germany against Portugal, who needed a point to qualify, he scored a 32nd minute opening goal. However, Liechtenstein were unable to keep their lead, with a Pauleta equaliser and an 85th minute Nuno Gomes winning goal turning the game on its head for a second time.

International goals

Honours

Club
Vaduz
 1. Liga Promotion (1): 2000–01
 Liechtensteiner Cup (9): 1999–00, 2000–01, 2003–04, 2004–05, 2005–06, 2006–07, 2007–08, 2008–09, 2010–11,

Individual
Liechtensteiner Footballer of the Year: 2003–04

References

External links
 FC Vaduz profile 

Liechtenstein footballers
Liechtenstein international footballers
Swiss men's footballers
Swiss people of Liechtenstein descent
People with acquired Liechtenstein citizenship
FC Vaduz players
1980 births
Living people
Association football forwards